"The Count of Chanteleine" (French Le Comte de Chanteleine), also known as The Count of Chanteleine: A Tale of the French Revolution, is a short story by Jules Verne published in 1864.

Plot
The story is about a nobleman whose wife is murdered during the French Revolution and his fight to save his daughter.

References

1864 short stories
Short stories by Jules Verne
Novels set in the French Revolution
Works by Jules Verne